Dragan Simeunović (born 17 September 1954) is a former Yugoslav football goalkeeper.

National team
He earned his only cap for SFR Yugoslavia on 30 March 1980 in their 2–0 win over Romania in a friendly match.

External links
reprezentacija.rs

1954 births
Living people
Sportspeople from Kraljevo
Serbian footballers
Yugoslav footballers
Yugoslavia international footballers
Serbian football managers
FK Sloga Kraljevo players
Red Star Belgrade footballers
FK Trepča players
FK Vardar players
OFK Beograd players
FK Budućnost Podgorica players
FK Radnički Beograd players
Apollon Pontou FC players
Olympiacos Volos F.C. players
Yugoslav First League players
Super League Greece players
Serbian expatriate footballers
Expatriate footballers in Greece
Association football goalkeepers
Panetolikos F.C. managers